Henderson was a town in Mason County, West Virginia, United States, at the confluence of the Ohio and Kanawha Rivers. The population was 231 at the 2020 census. It is part of the Point Pleasant, WV–OH Micropolitan Statistical Area. The town was incorporated in 1893 and named for Samuel Bruce Henderson, who owned the townsite at the time. The town was unincorporated following a public hearing on August 11, 2022.

History
Located near Henderson is the General John McCausland Memorial Farm, listed on the National Register of Historic Places in 2003.

Geography
Henderson is located at  (38.833035, -82.137216).

Demographics

2010 census
As of the census of 2010, there were 271 people, 114 households, and 72 families living in the town. The racial makeup of the town was 94.8% White, 1.5% African American, 1.1% Native American, 1.8% Asian, and 0.7% from two or more races. Hispanic or Latino of any race were 0.4% of the population.

There were 114 households, of which 31.6% had children under the age of 18 living with them, 38.6% were married couples living together, 18.4% had a female householder with no husband present, 6.1% had a male householder with no wife present, and 36.8% were non-families. 33.3% of all households were made up of individuals, and 8.8% had someone living alone who was 65 years of age or older. The average household size was 2.38 and the average family size was 3.00.

The median age in the town was 38.4 years. 24.7% of residents were under the age of 18; 8.5% were between the ages of 18 and 24; 26.5% were from 25 to 44; 25.4% were from 45 to 64; and 14.8% were 65 years of age or older. The gender makeup of the town was 46.5% male and 53.5% female.

2000 census
As of the census of 2000, there were 325 people, 134 households, and 95 families living in the town. The population density was 738.5 inhabitants per square mile (285.2/km2). There were 149 housing units at an average density of 338.6 per square mile (130.7/km2). The racial makeup of the town was 97.85% White, 0.31% from other races, and 1.85% from two or more races. Hispanic or Latino of any race were 0.31% of the population.

There were 134 households, out of which 28.4% had children under the age of 18 living with them, 47.0% were married couples living together, 20.1% had a female householder with no husband present, and 28.4% were non-families. 23.9% of all households were made up of individuals, and 11.2% had someone living alone who was 65 years of age or older. The average household size was 2.43 and the average family size was 2.81.

In the town, the population was spread out, with 24.0% under the age of 18, 10.8% from 18 to 24, 25.2% from 25 to 44, 26.2% from 45 to 64, and 13.8% who were 65 years of age or older. The median age was 39 years. For every 100 females, there were 81.6 males. For every 100 females age 18 and over, there were 84.3 males.

The median income for a household in the town was $15,865, and the median income for a family was $23,750. Males had a median income of $31,875 versus $13,750 for females. The per capita income for the town was $10,170. About 24.0% of families and 33.4% of the population were below the poverty line, including 38.2% of those under age 18 and 32.7% of those age 65 or over.

Climate
The climate in this area is characterized by relatively high temperatures and evenly distributed precipitation throughout the year.  According to the Köppen Climate Classification system, Henderson has a Humid subtropical climate, abbreviated "Cfa" on climate maps.

See also
 List of cities and towns along the Ohio River

References

Towns in Mason County, West Virginia
Towns in West Virginia
Populated places on the Kanawha River
Point Pleasant micropolitan area
Populated places established in 1893
West Virginia populated places on the Ohio River